Sobradinho is a municipality in the state of Rio Grande do Sul, Brazil.

Twin towns
Sobradinho is twinned with:

  Cornedo Vicentino, Veneto Region, since 2003

See also
List of municipalities in Rio Grande do Sul

References

Municipalities in Rio Grande do Sul